Theiler is a surname. Notable people with the surname include:

Arnold Theiler (1867–1936), South African scientist and veterinarian
Gertrud Theiler (1897–1986), South African parasitologist
Jorge Theiler (born 1964), Argentine footballer and manager
Max Theiler (1899–1972), South African-American virologist and physician
Rolf Theiler (born 1957), Swiss businessman and philanthropist

See also
Theiler (crater), a lunar impact crater